Margaret Roberts may refer to:
Margaret Roberts (Barbie), the fictional mother of Barbie, a doll
Margaret Thatcher (1925–2013), British stateswoman
Margaret Roberts (figure skater), 1947 participant in Canadian Figure Skating Championships
Margaret Roberts (herbalist) (1937–2017), South African herbalist and author
Margherita Roberti, American operatic soprano